"Ball for Me" is a song by American musician Post Malone featuring vocals Nicki Minaj. It was written by the artists and producer Louis Bell. The song was released through Republic Records on May 8, 2018, as the fourth single from Malone's second studio album, Beerbongs & Bentleys (2018), the song was also featured on the soundtrack to the EA Sports Video Game Madden NFL 19. The song debuted and peaked at number 16 on the US Billboard Hot 100, reached the top 10 in Canada and the top 20 in Australia and Slovakia.

Music video
The official music video for "Ball for Me" was teased by Minaj through various social media platforms on June 27, 2018. Later on Queen Radio, Minaj confirmed that the music video wouldn't be released due to the fact that Malone didn't like his visuals.

Credits and personnel
Credits adapted from Post Malone's official website.
 Post Malone – vocals, composition
 Nicki Minaj – vocals, composition
 Louis Bell – composition, production, programming, recording, vocal production
 Mike Bozzi – mastering
 Scott Desmarais – mixing assistance
 Robin Florent – mixing assistance
 Chris Galland – mixing assistance
 Manny Marroquin – mixing

Charts

Weekly charts

Year-end charts

Certifications

Release history

References

2018 singles
2018 songs
Nicki Minaj songs
Post Malone songs
Republic Records singles
Songs written by Louis Bell
Songs written by Nicki Minaj
Songs written by Post Malone
Song recordings produced by Louis Bell